The Avant is a mixed use tower located in Buffalo, New York. The building spans an entire city block between Elmwood Ave and Delaware Ave at West Huron, and features class A office space, an Embassy Suites hotel, and the top three floors feature luxury residential condominiums.  Upon its completion in 2009, the building set a record for housing the most expensive group of condominiums ever built in the Buffalo metropolitan area. Furthermore, as a result of the eco-conscious trend in national development companies, the building's remodeling is recognized as the largest recycling project in Western New York history. The building features energy efficient windows as well as underground parking and a number of other luxury amenities.

History
Construction began on this building in 1969 and was completed in 1971. It was originally constructed as the Thaddeus J. Dulski Federal Building housing 50 federal agencies and workforce of nearly 1,200. The US General Services Administration, which owned and operated the building, determined in the mid-2000s that the property would be too expensive to renovate, and vacated it in 2005. Uniland and Acquest Development companies purchased the building in April 2007 for $6.1 million and began renovating it for $83 million into the current mixed-use property.

Gallery

See also
 Delaware North Building
 List of tallest buildings in Buffalo

References

External links
 Official website
 Virtual tour of the building
 Skyscraperpage building page
 Sales Watch: Avant Residences Over 2/3 Sold

Skyscraper office buildings in Buffalo, New York
Skyscrapers in Buffalo, New York
Residential skyscrapers in New York (state)
Skyscraper hotels in New York (state)
Commercial buildings completed in 1973
1973 establishments in New York (state)